"Ginseng Strip 2002" is a song by Swedish rapper Yung Lean from his debut EP Lavender EP (2013). It was produced by Yung Gud. The music video of the song went viral in 2013, leading to Lean's rise to fame. The song later renewed popularity in 2022, through the video-sharing app TikTok.

Background
Producer Yung Gud described the process of recording the song, saying, "'Ginseng Strip 2002' was just a sound check — he [Yung Lean] was just checking to see if the microphone was working." The song sees Lean rapping about topics related to sex, drugs and sensitive content, including having oral sex with a cocaine addict that looks like Zooey Deschanel.

The song received significant attention in 2013 and is credited for propelling Yung Lean to recognition. At the beginning of 2022, it saw a resurgence in popularity, due to its use in TikTok.

Reception
The song has received mixed reception among critics and fans. Jonah Bromwich of Pitchfork wrote a negative response of Yung Lean's performance and the music video: "His verses are stilted, his movements awkward; he resembles a rap-obsessed misfit from a summer camp who freestyles poorly and doesn't worry about distinguishing between the positive and negative attention he's receiving." Cecilia Morales of The Ithacan called his music video "obscure" and said Lean had gained prominence for "producing songs and videos that are so bad they're good". Consequence of Sound placed "Ginseng Strip 2002" at number 44 on their "Top 50 Songs of 2013".

The general reaction towards the song has been more favorable since it regained prominence in 2022.

Music video
In the music video, Yung Lean is seen donning a bucket hat and doing the "cooking dance".

Charts

References

2013 songs
Yung Lean songs